"Here's a Drink" is the fourth and final single from Stone Crazy, a 1997 album by East Coast hip hop group The Beatnuts. It was released as a single by independent label Dixie Cup Records in 1997 and remains rare. The song is produced by The Beatnuts and features raps by Juju and Psycho Les. The track samples "1nce Again" by A Tribe Called Quest. The song failed to chart or receive positive critical attention: Tom Doggett of RapReviews.com blames this on its "unconventional sample" and awkward staggered drums. It is nonetheless featured on The Beatnuts' 1999 hits compilation World Famous Classics.

Track listing
A-Side
 "Here's a Drink" (Vocal)

B-Side
 "Here's a Drink" (Instrumental)

References

1997 singles
Here's a Drink
Songs written by J Dilla
Songs written by Q-Tip (musician)
Songs written by Ali Shaheed Muhammad
Songs written by Phife Dawg
1997 songs